Acrocercops siphonaula is a species of moth in the family Gracillariidae. It is found in Sierra Leone.

The larvae feed on Cola species, including Cola nitida. They probably mine the leaves of their host plant.

References

siphonaula
Moths of Africa
Moths described in 1931